In logic and mathematics, diagonalization may refer to:
 Matrix diagonalization, a construction of a diagonal matrix (with nonzero entries only on the main diagonal) that is similar to a given matrix
 Diagonal argument (disambiguation), various closely related proof techniques, including:
 Cantor's diagonal argument, used to prove that the set of real numbers is not countable
Diagonal lemma, used to create self-referential sentences in formal logic
 Table diagonalization, a form of data reduction used to make interpretation of tables and charts easier.